Nobleboro, founded in 1788, is a town in Lincoln County, Maine, United States. The population was 1,791 at the 2020 census. Nobleboro is named for Arthur Noble's son Arthur II. Part of Nobleboro was part of Shem Drowne's claim in the 1730s.

History
On August 7, 1823, Maine's first recorded meteorite fall occurred in Nobleboro. Observers initially mistook it for musket fire. The meteorite is stored at the Buseck Center for Meteorite Studies at Arizona State University.

Geography
Notable lakes are Damariscotta Lake and Pemaquid Pond.

Climate
This climatic region is typified by large seasonal temperature differences, with warm to hot (and often humid) summers and cold (sometimes severely cold) winters. According to the Köppen Climate Classification system, Nobleboro has a humid continental climate, abbreviated "Dfb" on climate maps.

Demographics

2010 census
As of the census of 2010, there were 1,643 people, 714 households, and 471 families living in the town. The racial makeup of the town was 98.4% White, 0.1% African American, 0.5% Native American, 0.4% Asian, 0.1% from other races, and 0.5% from two or more races. Hispanic or Latino of any race were 0.2% of the population.

There were 714 households, of which 27.5% had children under the age of 18 living with them, 52.9% were married couples living together, 8.8% had a female householder with no husband present, 4.2% had a male householder with no wife present, and 34.0% were non-families. 25.9% of all households were made up of individuals, and 11.5% had someone living alone who was 65 years of age or older. The average household size was 2.30 and the average family size was 2.75.

The median age in the town was 46.9 years. 20% of residents were under the age of 18; 6.4% were between the ages of 18 and 24; 20.3% were from 25 to 44; 34.3% were from 45 to 64; and 19.1% were 65 years of age or older. The gender makeup of the town was 49.5% male and 50.5% female.

2000 census
As of the census of 2000, there were 1,626 people, 678 households, and 465 families living in the town. The racial makeup of the town was 98.59% White, 0.12% African American, 0.06% Native American, 0.43% Asian, 0.06% from other races, and 0.74% from two or more races. Hispanic or Latino of any race were 0.49% of the population.

There were 678 households, out of which 30.8% had children under the age of 18 living with them, 57.7% were married couples living together, 7.7% had a female householder with no husband present, and 31.4% were non-families. 26.0% of all households were made up of individuals, and 10.8% had someone living alone who was 65 years of age or older.  The average household size was 2.39 and the average family size was 2.89.

In the town, the population was spread out, with 24.8% under the age of 18, 5.5% from 18 to 24, 25.4% from 25 to 44, 29.2% from 45 to 64, and 15.1% who were 65 years of age or older.  The median age was 42 years. For every 100 females there were 91.7 males.  For every 100 females aged 18 and over, there were 89.3 males.

The median income for a household in the town was $39,805, and the median income for a family was $46,838. Males had a median income of $32,104 versus $24,107 for females. The per capita income for the town was $21,373.  About 5.4% of families and 7.7% of the population were below the poverty line, including 9.2% of those under aged 18 and 9.2% of those age 65 or over.

Transportation
Nobleboro is served by U.S. Route 1 and the Rockland Branch Railroad passes through the town.

Notable people
 Henry Beston, author and naturalist, and his wife Elizabeth Coatsworth, an award-winning author of 90 books; lived and died in Nobleboro at Chimney Farm
 Chloe Maxmin, state senator
 Linwood E. Palmer Jr., state legislator from Nobleboro
 Val Picinich, baseball catcher; died in Nobleboro
 Shoshana Zuboff, award-winning author and surveillance economics scholar, lives in Nobleboro

References

External links
Official website
Maine.gov Local profile
Epodunk profile
Nobleboro Historical Society
Maine Genealogy: Nobleboro, Lincoln County, Maine

Towns in Lincoln County, Maine